Chalcosyrphus americanus is a species of hoverfly in the family Syrphidae.

Distribution
South America.

References

Eristalinae
Insects described in 1868
Diptera of South America
Taxa named by Ignaz Rudolph Schiner